Arnett is an unincorporated community in Braxton County, West Virginia, United States.

References

Unincorporated communities in Braxton County, West Virginia
Unincorporated communities in West Virginia